Estadio José López Portillo is a stadium in Chetumal, Quintana Roo, Mexico.  It is primarily used for soccer, and is the home field of Yalmakán F.C. and Deportivo Chetumal. It holds 6,600 people.

History
The stadium was opened on March 13, 1980, however, until 1982 it began to host official matches.  Between 2008 and 2009 it was the field of the Potros Chetumal, a reserve team of Atlante F.C. who played in the Primera División 'A'.

In 2018 the stadium underwent a remodeling so that it could host matches of the Liga Premier de México, the third level of Mexican football, because from that year on it became the stadium of the Yalmakán, a team that competes in that league.

References

Sports venues in Quintana Roo
Football venues in Mexico